The Chicago Cubs are a Major League Baseball (MLB) franchise based in Chicago, Illinois. They play in the National League Central division.  Since the institution of MLB's Rule 4 Draft, the Cubs have selected 68 players in the first round. Officially known as the "First-Year Player Draft", the Rule 4 Draft is MLB's primary mechanism for assigning amateur baseball players from high schools, colleges, and other amateur baseball clubs to its teams. The draft order is determined based on the previous season's standings, with the team possessing the worst record receiving the first pick. In addition, teams which lost free agents in the previous off-season may be awarded compensatory or supplementary picks.

Of the 68 players picked in the first round by the Cubs, 32 have been pitchers, the most of any position; 24 of these were right-handed, while 6 were left-handed. Sixteen players picked in the initial round were outfielders, while ten shortstops, two catchers, and one player each at first base, second base, and third base were also taken.  The Cubs drafted 26 players out of high school, and 32 out of college.  Chicago has drafted eleven players from high schools or colleges in the state of California, with six more coming from Texas and five from Indiana.  The Cubs have also taken four players from their home state of Illinois.

The Cubs' most recent World Series championship, in 2016, was the team's first in 108 years. Four of the Cubs' first-round draft picks—Javier Báez (2011), Albert Almora (2012), Kris Bryant (2013), and Kyle Schwarber (2014)—were on the 2016 World Series roster. No pick has been elected to the Hall of Fame. Bryant is the Cubs' only first-round pick to be named Most Valuable Player in either the National or American League, winning NL honors in 2016. He is also one of two picks to have been named NL Rookie of the Year with the Cubs, receiving this award in 2015; the other is Kerry Wood, selected in 1995 and named Rookie of the Year in 1998. One pick—1985 selection Rafael Palmeiro—is a member of both the 3,000 hit club and the 500 home run club.  The Cubs have held the first overall pick in the draft only once, in 1982, when they selected Shawon Dunston.

The Cubs have received 13 compensatory picks, including nine selections made in the supplemental round of the draft since the institution of the First-Year Player Draft in 1965. These additional picks are provided when a team loses a particularly valuable free agent in the previous off-season, or, more recently, if a team fails to sign a draft pick from the previous year.  As the Cubs have signed all of their first-round picks, they have never been awarded a supplementary pick under this provision.

Key

Picks

Notes

See also
Chicago Cubs minor league players

Footnotes
 Through the 2012 draft, free agents were evaluated by the Elias Sports Bureau and rated "Type A", "Type B", or not compensation-eligible. If a team offered arbitration to a player but that player refused and subsequently signed with another team, the original team was able to receive additional draft picks. If a "Type A" free agent left in this way, his previous team received a supplemental pick and a compensatory pick from the team with which he signed. If a "Type B" free agent left in this way, his previous team received only a supplemental pick. Since the 2013 draft, free agents are no longer classified by type; instead, compensatory picks are only awarded if the team offered its free agent a contract worth at least the average of the 125 current richest MLB contracts. However, if the free agent's last team acquired the player in a trade during the last year of his contract, it is ineligible to receive compensatory picks for that player.
 The Cubs gained a compensatory first-round pick in 1981 from the Cincinnati Reds for losing free agent Larry Biittner.
 The Cubs gained a compensatory first-round pick in 1982 from the Montreal Expos for losing free agent Tim Blackwell.
 The Cubs gained a supplemental first-round pick in 1982 for losing free agent Tim Blackwell.
 The Cubs gained a compensatory first-round pick in 1985 from the Baltimore Orioles for losing free agent Tim Stoddard.
 The Cubs gained a compensatory first-round pick in 1993 from the Atlanta Braves for losing free agent Greg Maddux.
 The Cubs gained a supplemental first-round pick in 1993 for losing free agent Greg Maddux.
 The Cubs gained a supplemental first-round pick in 2002 for losing free agent David Weathers.
 The Cubs gained a supplemental first-round pick in 2002 for losing free agent Rondell White.
 The Cubs gained a supplemental first-round pick in 2002 for losing free agent Todd Van Poppel.
 The Cubs lost their first-round pick in 2004 to the Minnesota Twins as compensation for signing free agent LaTroy Hawkins.
 The Cubs gained a supplemental first-round pick in 2007 for losing free agent Juan Pierre.
 The Cubs gained a supplemental first-round pick in 2008 for losing free agent Jason Kendall.
 The Cubs gained a supplemental first-round pick in 2012 for losing free agent Aramis Ramírez.
 The Cubs gained a supplemental first-round pick in 2012 for losing free agent Carlos Pena.
 The Cubs lost their first-round pick in 2016 to the St. Louis Cardinals as compensation for signing free agent Jason Heyward.

References
General references

"Chicago Cubs First Round Picks with Signing Bonuses". Fueled by Sports. Retrieved July 4, 2016.
In-text citations

First-round
Chicago Cubs